Professor Richard J. Finlay FRHistS is the current Head of the School of Humanities at the University of Strathclyde and the author of a number of books, particularly on the modern history of Scotland.

He has previously articulated the view that history has an important place in a modern democracy.

Publications
Some of his main publications include:
 
 
 

He has also edited such books as:

References

Living people
Year of birth missing (living people)
Historians of Scotland
Place of birth missing (living people)
Academics of the University of Strathclyde
Scottish political writers
20th-century Scottish historians
Alumni of the University of Edinburgh
Alumni of the University of Stirling
Fellows of the Royal Historical Society
21st-century Scottish historians